A list of horror films released in 2001.

References

Lists of horror films by year
2001-related lists